Colonia is a surname. Notable people with the surname include:

Adam Colonia (1634–1685), Dutch painter 
Gregorio Colonia (born 1963), Filipino weightlifter
Isaac Colonia (1611–1663), Dutch painter
Nestor Colonia (born 1992), Filipino weightlifter, nephew of Gregorio